Tarucus waterstradti dharta, the Assam Pierrot, is a small butterfly found in India that belongs to the lycaenids or blues family.

Formerly considered a distinct species, it is now generally regarded as a well-marked subspecies of T. waterstradti.

See also
List of butterflies of India
List of butterflies of India (Lycaenidae)

Further reading
 
  
 
 
 
 

Tarucus
Butterflies of Asia
Butterfly subspecies